Bashar Resan Bonyan Albu-Mohammed (born 22 December 1996) is an Iraqi professional footballer who plays as a midfielder for Qatar SC and the Iraq national team.

Club career

Early years
Bashar is the son of former Iraq and Sikak Al-Hadeed player of the 70s, Resan Bonyan. He started playing on Palestine Street in the Iraqi capital for local team 14 Tammuz and had the privilege of being a student at the Ammo Baba Football School from the age of 12 and spent two years at the school before joining Al-Quwa Al-Jawiya at 13. He first played for the Al-Quwa Al-Jawiya Junior team and in the space of just nine months he found himself in the first team.

Al-Quwa Al-Jawiya
Rasan started his career at Al-Quwa Al-Jawiya, where he made his league debut in 2011. In the 2010–2011 season he was plucked from the Al-Quwa Al-Jawiya junior side where at 14 was playing with boys much older than himself to train with the first team after he was seen in a game by team coach Thair Ahmed, and he has been a first team member since. The winger has become the youngest player in the history in their 83-year existence and went on to sign a senior contract with the club. He scored the opening goal of the 2016 Iraq FA Cup Final which his team went on to win.

Persepolis
On 3 July 2017, Resan signed a two-year contract with Persian Gulf Pro League Champions Persepolis. He joined the team after the end of the Iraqi regular season, which he won alongside Al-Quwa Al-Jawiya. He made his league debut in 1–0 loss to Paykan on 17 September. He Played a few minutes in his first season. Resan was influential in his second season at the club and played more there. He scored his first goal against Saipa. His contract was extended until the end of the 2020–21 season. On 20 December 2020, he left the club by mutual consent, to move to Qatar SC.

Qatar SC 
On 31 December 2020, Qatar SC announced the signing of Resan after successful seasons with Persepolis.

Career statistics

Club

International career
On 4 September 2014, Resan made his International debut against Peru in a friendly match that ended 0–2 for Peru. He went onto will make his full international debut for Iraq at the age of just 17 years, 8 months and 13 days after first coming to prominence in the Iraqi league in 2010 at the age of 14. After qualifying for the Olympics, the player gave his AFC U-23 winners’ medal to a mother whose son was one of 1,700 Iraqi soldiers martyred in the Speicher massacre in 2014.

International goals
Scores and results list Iraq's goal tally first.

Honours

Club
Al-Quwa Al-Jawiya
Iraqi Premier League (1) : 2016–17 
Iraq FA Cup (1) : 2015–16 
AFC Cup (1) : 2016

Persepolis
Persian Gulf Pro League (3) : 2017–18, 2018–19, 2019–20
Hazfi Cup (1) : 2018–19
Iranian Super Cup (3) : 2017, 2018, 2019
AFC Champions League runner-up: 2018, 2020

International
Iraq U-23
AFC U-22 Championship: 2014
Iraq Military
CISM World Football Trophy: 2013

References

External links

1996 births
Living people
Sportspeople from Baghdad
Iraqi footballers
Iraqi expatriate footballers
Iraq international footballers
Association football midfielders
Asian Games medalists in football
Footballers at the 2014 Asian Games
Al-Quwa Al-Jawiya players
Persepolis F.C. players
Qatar SC players
Iraqi Premier League players
Persian Gulf Pro League players
Qatar Stars League players
Asian Games bronze medalists for Iraq
2019 AFC Asian Cup players
Medalists at the 2014 Asian Games
Iraqi expatriate sportspeople in Iran
Expatriate footballers in Iran
Iraqi expatriate sportspeople in Qatar
Expatriate footballers in Qatar